Bear Creek is a stream in Henry County in the U.S. state of Missouri. It is a tributary of Deepwater Creek.

The stream headwaters arise in the southwest corner of Henry County about 2.5 miles north of Appleton City (at ) at an elevation of about  adjacent to Missouri Route KK.

Bear Creek most likely was named for the bears in the area.

See also
List of rivers of Missouri

References

Rivers of Henry County, Missouri
Rivers of Missouri